Crèdit Andorrà is an Andorran banking house. It was founded in 1949 and is headquartered in Andorra la Vella. In 2015, the company had more than 800 employees.

See also 

 Rafael Termes, one of the establishers of Crèdit Andorrà
 List of banks in Andorra

References

External links
 Official website
 Crèdit Andorrà at AndorraPartner

Banks of Andorra
Banks established in 1949